Gretel Wins First Prize is a 1933 German comedy film directed by Carl Boese and starring Lucie Englisch, Leopold von Ledebur and Jakob Tiedtke. It was shot at the Babelsberg Studios in Berlin. The film's sets were designed by the art director Willi Herrmann.

Synopsis
A young woman pretends to have won first prize in a lottery in an effort to boost her dreams of a career in radio.

Cast
Lucie Englisch as Gretel Schmidt, saleswoman
Leopold von Ledebur as her boss
Jakob Tiedtke as his uncle
Hans Brausewetter as Willy Zinsler, pianist
Hilde Hildebrand as Gerda, his divorced wife
Walter Steinbeck as Herklotz, banker
Margarete Kupfer as Frau Müller, Gretel's landlady
Josefine Dora as Aufwartefrau
Wilhelm Gerber as second musician
Gertrud Boll as Gretel's girlfriend
Herti Kirchner as Gretel's girlfriend
Tilly Spatz as Gretel's girlfriend
Hans Joachim Schaufuß as apprentice
Ernst Behmer
Alexander Bender as first musician
Harry Berber
Fred Goebel
Heinz Klingenberg
Georg Schmieter
Grethe Weiser

References

Bibliography 
 Klaus, Ulrich J. Deutsche Tonfilme: Jahrgang 1933. Klaus-Archiv, 1988.

External links

1933 comedy films
German comedy films
Films of Nazi Germany
Films directed by Carl Boese
German black-and-white films
1930s German films
1930s German-language films
Films shot at Babelsberg Studios